Left Turn was a bimonthly activist news magazine that focused on international social justice movements. Based in New York City and produced by an all volunteer editorial collective, the magazine promoted anti-imperialism and anti-authoritarianism.

Left Turn had its roots in the anti-capitalist wing of the Global Justice Movement and was founded in the wake of the anti-WTO protests in Seattle in 1999 by a small group of socialists.

The magazine's tagline, "Notes from the Global Intifada", was inspired by the then ongoing Palestinian intifada. The magazine supported grassroots activists with the Palestine Solidarity Movement. The magazine ceased print publication after the August 2011 issue, but continues to operate a website.

.

References

External links
Official website

Anti-capitalism
Anti-imperialism in North America
Bimonthly magazines published in the United States
Criticism of neoconservatism
Defunct political magazines published in the United States
Magazines established in 1999
Magazines disestablished in 2011
Magazines published in New York City
News magazines published in the United States
1999 establishments in New York City